The Invasion may refer to:

 The Invasion (album), 2011 album by Nigerian duo P-Square
 The Invasion (Doctor Who), a 1968 Doctor Who serial starring Patrick Troughton
 The Invasion (film), a 2007 film starring Nicole Kidman and Daniel Craig
 The Invasion (Animorphs), the first book in the Animorphs series, published 1996
 The Invasion (professional wrestling), a professional wrestling storyline from 2001
 The Invasion, a 2018 photograph by Paul Tsui of the Grand Lisboa

See also

 Invasion (disambiguation)